Same-sex marriage in Washington has been legally recognized since December 6, 2012. On February 13, 2012, Governor Christine Gregoire signed legislation that established full marriage rights for same-sex couples in the state of Washington. Opponents mounted a challenge that required voters to approve the statute at a referendum, which they did on November 6. The law took effect on December 6, and the first marriages were celebrated on December 9. Within a couple of days, more than 600 marriage licenses were issued to same-sex couples in King County alone.

Previously, in 1998, the state had enacted the Defense of Marriage Act that restricted marriage to different-sex couples, reinforcing its statutes that had been interpreted by a state court in 1974 as imposing the same restriction. Several lawsuits filed in state court challenged the state's marriage laws without success, including one filed in 1971, one of the first such cases in the United States.

Statutory ban
In 1997, the Washington State Legislature, in response to events in Hawaii that suggested that the state might legalize same-sex marriage, passed a bill that would define marriage as the union of a man and a woman and deny legal recognition to same-sex marriages established elsewhere. The vote was 63 to 35 in the House and 27 to 19 in the Senate. Governor Gary Locke vetoed the legislation on February 21, calling it "divisive and unnecessary", citing the 1974 state court decision in Singer v. Hara. He wrote in his veto message: "Our overarching principle should be to promote civility, mutual respect and unity. This legislation fails to meet this test." An attempt to override his veto failed in the state Senate on a party-line vote, 26 to 20, when seven Democrats who had originally supported the measure changed their position to support Governor Locke. Although Republicans threatened to put the issue to a popular referendum in November, some of their members thought the issue was not urgent enough to risk a contentious public campaign.

In 1998, the State Legislature passed the same legislation, the Defense of Marriage Act, and expected Governor Locke to allow it to become law without his signature. Instead, he vetoed it a second time, saying that "Our laws right now prohibit same-gender marriages, and I oppose this legislation because it is trying to make illegal something that is already illegal". Democrats who feared the impact of having the legislation on the November ballot helped override his veto. One Democratic leader in the House said: "I'll vote to override. I'll stand up and say it's a bad bill, but it's even worse to have this issue on the ballot." According to The Seattle Times: "Lawmakers, eager to be done with the controversial issue, rushed the ban through in minutes and dumped it in the governor's lap. Locke's veto came within the hour. Then both houses voted summarily to override the veto. No one could remember the last time a bill was passed, vetoed and overridden within hours–with almost no discussion and no debate."

Lawsuits

Singer v. Hara
In 1971, in Seattle, in one of the first same-sex marriage lawsuits in the United States, gay activists John Singer (later known as Faygele Ben-Miriam) and Paul Barwick requested a marriage license from the King County auditor, Lloyd Hara, to demonstrate the inequality between gay and heterosexual couples. Hara refused, and Singer and Barwick brought suit on the grounds that the denial violated the Equal Rights Amendment of the State Constitution. The Washington Court of Appeals denied the claim in 1974 in Singer v. Hara. The Washington Supreme Court refused to review the decision.

Andersen v. King County

On March 8, 2004, six same-sex couples represented by Lambda Legal filed suit in state court challenging the constitutionality of Washington's Defense of Marriage Act. The four constitutional claims were based on due process, privacy, equal protection and gender equality. On August 4, King County Superior Court Judge William L. Downing issued an opinion in Andersen v. Sims that the state had no rational basis for excluding same-sex couples from the rights and benefits of marriage. The decision concluded that the state law limiting marriage to different-sex couples violated sections of the Constitution that required due process and equal protection of the laws. The court did not require the state to allow same-sex couples to marry, but mandated the creation of a civil union status that would provide all the rights and benefits of marriage to same-sex couples. Downing stayed enforcement of his order pending appeal to the Washington Supreme Court. On April 1, 2004, eleven same-sex couples represented by the American Civil Liberties Union filed suit in state court challenging Washington's laws that banned same-sex couples from marrying. It also sought recognition of marriages performed legally in other jurisdictions. On September 7, Thurston County Superior Court Judge Richard D. Hicks ruled in Castle v. State that the state's marriage laws violated the equal protection of privileges and immunities clause of the State Constitution.

The Washington Supreme Court consolidated the two cases, Andersen v. Sims and Castle v. State, for review as Andersen v. King County. It heard oral arguments on March 8, 2005. On July 26, 2006, it reversed the trial courts' determinations in a 5–4 ruling. The majority opinion focused on the constitutionality of the State Legislature's enactment of the Defense of Marriage Act limiting the privileges of marriage to opposite-sex couples. In October 2006, the court refused to reconsider its ruling.

Initiative 957
On January 10, 2007, the Washington Defense of Marriage Alliance, an activist organization that, despite its name, favored marriage rights for same-sex couples, filed a voter initiative, Initiative 957, to incorporate part of the Andersen decision into state statutes by making procreation a requirement for all marriages in Washington state. The group's stated rationale was to prompt public examination of the premise that marriage exists for the purpose of procreation and to create a test case in which Andersen would be reversed. The initiative's sponsors withdrew it on July 3, after failing to gather a sufficient number of signatures to qualify for the November ballot.

Same-sex marriage law

Advocates of marriage rights for same-sex couples, lacking the votes in the State Legislature to accomplish their objective, instead focused on enacting domestic partnerships that would grant such couples a subset of the rights attached to marriage. A law to this effect was approved by the State Legislature. This legal status was also made available under certain circumstances to different-sex couples. The legislation took effect on April 22, 2007. A same-sex marriage bill was also introduced in the 2007 legislative session, but failed to make it out of committee.

On January 26, 2012, legislation legalizing same-sex marriage and converting most domestic partnerships not dissolved within two years into marriages passed the Washington State Senate's Committee for Government Operations, Tribal Relations and Elections. Republican Dan Swecker introduced four amendments that failed on a party-line vote of 3–4. Republican Don Benton asked for the legislation to be placed on the November 2012 ballot as a referendum but his motion failed by a 3–4 vote. The bill was reported out of the committee by a 4–3 vote. It passed the Senate by a vote of 28–21 on February 1.

The House of Representatives took up the same measure and passed it out of the Judiciary Committee on January 30 by a 7–6 party-line vote. The committee voted on the Senate-approved version of the bill on February 6, passing it by a 7–5 vote, with one Republican committee member absent. The House passed the legislation on February 8 by a vote of 55–43. The legislation also provided that all domestic partnerships not involving at least one member aged 62 years or older and not dissolved within two years of the date the law goes into effect would automatically become marriages. Governor Christine Gregoire signed the bill into law on February 13. It was scheduled to take effect 90 days after the end of the legislative session.

Same-sex marriage referendum

Opponents of the legalization of same-sex marriage delayed its implementation by collecting the signatures necessary to put the measure to a popular vote on November 6, 2012, as Referendum 74. In that referendum, voters approved the law by a 54%–46% margin. The law took effect on December 6. Because Washington requires a three-day waiting period (excluding the day of issue) before a marriage license may be signed, the first same-sex marriages in the state took place on December 9, 2012.

Following the coming into effect of the same-sex marriage law on December 6, 2012, the definition of marriage in the state of Washington is now as follows:

Native American nations
Same-sex marriage is legal on the reservations of the Confederated Tribes of the Colville Reservation, whose Tribal Council voted unanimously to legalize same-sex marriage in September 2013, the Port Gamble S'Klallam Tribe, the Puyallup Tribe of Indians, whose Tribal Council voted unanimously to legalize in July 2014, the Suquamish Tribe, which was the first tribe to do so in August 2011, and the Tulalip Tribes of Washington. The Tulalip Board of Directors amended the Tribal Code on May 6, 2016 to state: "'Marriage' means the legal union of two persons, regardless of their sex, created to the exclusion of all others." The Port Gamble S'Klallam Tribe announced in the wake of Referendum 74 in December 2012 that they would allow same-sex couples to marry on their reservation, including at the Heronswood Botanical Gardens in Kingston.

Many Native American tribes have traditions of two-spirit individuals who were born male but wore women's clothing and performed everyday household work and artistic handiwork which were regarded as belonging to the feminine sphere. This two-spirit status allowed for marriages between two biological males or two biological females to be performed among some of these tribes. The Quileute, who live in the present-day Quileute Indian Reservation in La Push, call them .

Economic impact
In 2006, a study from the University of California, Los Angeles estimated the impact of allowing same-sex couples to marry on Washington's state budget. The study concluded that allowing same-sex couples to marry would result in a net gain of approximately $3.9 million to $5.7 million each year for the state. This net impact would result from savings in state expenditures on means-tested public benefits programs and from an increase in sales tax revenue from weddings and wedding-related tourism.

Marriage statistics
By September 2013, nine months after same-sex marriage was legalized in Washington state, 7,071 same-sex couples had legally entered into a marriage, 3,452 of them in highly populated King County. Same-sex marriages accounted for 17% of all marriages, and 62% of those were between women.

By December 31, 2015, approximately 15,750 same-sex marriages had been performed in Washington state, a significant proportion of which occurred in the first 12 months of legalisation. 2,091 same-sex marriages were performed in 2016, 1,915 in 2017, 1,884 in 2018, 1,690 in 2019, and 1,747 in 2020, with most being between lesbian couples. These figures do not include conversions from domestic partnerships.

Public opinion

A May 2011 Public Policy Polling (PPP) survey found that 46% of Washington voters thought same-sex marriage should be legal, while 44% thought it should be illegal and 10% were not sure.

An October 2011 University of Washington poll found that 55% of Washington voters would vote to uphold a legislatively approved same-sex marriage bill if it were put to a referendum, while 38% would oppose it and 7% were undecided. A separate question on the same survey found that 43% of respondents thought that gay and lesbian couples should have the same right to marry as straight couples, 22% thought that gay and lesbian couples should have the same rights as straight couples without the word "marriage", 15% thought that gay and lesbian couples should have domestic partnerships with only some of the rights of marriage, while 17% opposed all legal recognition, and 3% did not know.

A February 2012 PPP survey found that 50% of Washington voters would vote to uphold a same-sex marriage law, while 46% would vote to repeal it and 4% were not sure. In addition, 32% believed that same-sex couples should be allowed to enter civil unions but not marriage and 20% were opposed to all legal recognition of same-sex relationships.

A June 2012 PPP survey found that 51% of Washington voters thought same-sex marriage should be legal, while 42% thought it should be illegal and 7% were not sure. A survey conducted by the same polling organization in November 2012 found that 54% of Washington voters thought same-sex marriage should be legal, while 40% thought it should be illegal and 5% were not sure. A May 2015 PPP survey showed that 56% of Washington voters thought same-sex marriage should be legal, while 36% thought it should be illegal and 8% were not sure.

A 2016 Public Religion Research Institute (PRRI) poll found that 64% of Washington residents supported same-sex marriage, while 26% were opposed and 10% were unsure or undecided. In 2017, the PRRI placed support at 73% and opposition at 21%. A 2020 PRRI survey showed that 72% of Washington respondents supported same-sex marriage, while 22% were opposed and 6% were undecided or did not answer. A survey conducted by the same polling organization between March and November 2021 found that 82% of Washington respondents were in favour of same-sex marriage, while 16% were opposed and 2% were undecided.

See also
LGBT rights in Washington (state)
Domestic partnership in Washington state
History of the LGBT community in Seattle
Law of Washington (state)
Washington United for Marriage

References

External links
Singer v. Hara, Washington Court of Appeals, May 1974
Andersen v. Sims, King County Superior Court, August 2004
Andersen v. King County, Washington Supreme Court, July 2006
All decisions in Andersen v. King County, Washington Supreme Court

Washington
LGBT in Washington (state)
Washington (state) law
Articles containing video clips
2012 in Washington (state)
2012 in LGBT history